Sir John Christian William Birkin, 6th Baronet (born 2 July 1953) is a British director and producer.

Biography
John Birkin is a television director and production manager, known for Mr. Bean (1990), Chef! (1993), and Victoria Wood with All the Trimmings (2000), among other television shows.

Birkin's father was the Gothic novelist Charles Birkin and his mother was the Australia-born actress Janet Johnson. He and the actress Jane Birkin both come from the lineage of the Birkin baronetcy and he is the 6th baronet. He is the cousin of Andrew Birkin, David Birkin, Jane Birkin, and Ned Birkin. He was married to Emma Gage on 25 June 1994 and they have two children.

Filmography
As director
 1987: French and Saunders (TV series)
 1988: 1st Exposure
 1990: Harry Enfield's Television Programme (TV series)
 1991: The Trouble with Mr. Bean (video)
 1992: The Merry Mishaps of Mr. Bean (video)
 1992: The Perilous Pursuits of Mr. Bean (video)
 1992: Tales from the Poop Deck (TV series)
 1993: Chef! (television series)
 1993: The Smell of Reeves and Mortimer (TV series)
 1994: The Final Frolics of Mr. Bean (video)
 1994: The Honeymoon's Over (TV)
 1995: Unseen Bean (video)
 1995: Mister Fowler ("The Thin Blue Line") (TV series)
 1996: Never Mind the Horrocks (TV)
 1997: The Best Bits of Mr. Bean (video)
 1997: Dame Edna Kisses It Better (TV series)
 1997: It's Ulrika! (TV)
 1998: You Are Here (TV)
 1999: Mrs. Merton and Malcolm (TV series)
 2000: Victoria Wood with All the Trimmings (TV)
 2000: The Creatives
 2001: The Fitz (TV  series)
 2002: Dead Ringers (TV series)
 2003: The Sitcom Story (TV)

As producer
 1993 : The Smell of Reeves and Mortimer (TV series)

See also
 Birkin baronets

References

External links
 

1953 births
British television directors
British television producers
Baronets in the Baronetage of the United Kingdom
Living people
British people of Australian descent